Stephen Ashbrook (born January 10, 1971 in Newport Beach, California) is a Phoenix, Arizona based singer songwriter. Ashbrook rose to fame in the mid-1990s in his home state of Arizona, riding the wave of the Tempe music scene while performing with his band Satellite. Many bands, including the Gin Blossoms, The Refreshments and Dead Hot Workshop, found success with this guitar-driven rock music. Ashbrook has toured with Roger Clyne and the Peacemakers, among others, and has performed for President Bill Clinton.

Discography

References

Living people
American male singer-songwriters
1969 births
Singer-songwriters from Oregon
Singer-songwriters from Arizona